Portugal competed at the 1972 Summer Olympics in Munich, West Germany. 29 competitors, all men, took part in 28 events in 8 sports.

Athletics

Men's 110m Hurdles:
 Alberto Filipe Matos — 1st round: 7th (heat 3)

Men's 400m:
 Fernando Silva — 1st round: 6th (heat 5)

Men's 400m Hurdles:
 José de Jesus Carvalho — 1st round: 6th (heat 5)

Men's 800m:
 Fernando Pacheco Mamede — 1st round: 4th (heat 4)

Men's 1500m:
 Fernando Pacheco Mamede — 1st round: 6th (heat 7)

Men's 5000m:
 Carlos Lopes — 1st round: 9th (heat 1)

Men's 10000m:
 Carlos Lopes — 1st round: 9th (heat 3)

Men's Marathon:
 Armando Aldegalega — 41st (2:28.24,6)

Men's 4 × 400 m:
 Alberto Filipe Matos, Fernando Silva, Fernando Pacheco Mamede and José de Jesus Carvalho — 1st round: 7th (heat 1)

Equestrian

Individual Jumping:
 Carlos Campos — 13th
 Francisco Caldeira — eliminated
 Vasco Ramires Sr. — eliminated

Team Jumping:
 Carlos Campos, Francisco Caldeira and Vasco Ramires Sr. — 13th (107,5 points)

Judo

Men's Half-Middleweight (–70 kg):
 António Roquete Andrade — qualifiers (poule A)

Men's Middleweight (–80 kg):
 Orlando Ferreira — qualifiers (poule B)

Rowing

Men's Single Sculls
José Lopes Marques
Heat — 8:39.73
Repechage — 8:54.27 (→ did not advance)

Double Sculls:
 Carlos Almeida Oliveira and Manuel Silva Barroso — repechage: 4th (heat 2)

Sailing

Dragon:
 Mário Quina, Fernando Pinto Coelho Bello and Francisco Quina — 21st (120 points)

Finn:
 José Quina — 11th (190,7 points)

Star:
 António Mardel Correia and Ulrich Henrique Anjos — 6th (68,4 points)

Shooting

Five male shooters represented Portugal in 1972.

25 m pistol
 André Antunes — 36th (578 marks)

50 m pistol
 André Antunes — 55th (510 marks)

50 m rifle, prone
 César Batista — 90th (578 marks)
 Mário Ribeiro — 92nd (575 marks)

50 m rifle, three positions
 César Batista — 61st (1057 marks)
 Mário Ribeiro — 63rd (1051 marks)

Skeet
 José de Matos — 49th (179 marks)

Trap
 Armando Silva Marques — 19th (187 marks)

Weightlifting

Men's Bantamweight (–56 kg):
 Raul Diniz — 21st (285 points)

Wrestling

Men's Freestyle Featherweight (–62 kg):
 Orlando Gonçalves — 2nd round: eliminated

Men's Greco-Roman Flyweight (–52 kg):
 Leonel Duarte — 2nd round: eliminated

Men's Greco-Roman Bantamweight (–57 kg):
 Luís Grilo — 4th round: eliminated

Officials
 Fernando Machado (chief of mission)
 Dido Fonseca Aguiar
 Francisco Ferreira Alves
 Fernando Sommer Andrade
 Francisco Augusto
 Luis V. Caldas
 José Carvalhosa
 António Castanheira
 António Madeira Correia
 Domingos A. Souse Coutinho
 Carlos F. Dias Silva
 João Esteves
 Francisco Ferreira
 Manuel Forão
 Francisco Graça Gordo
 Carlos M. Loureiro
 Fernando M. C. Costa Matos
 António M. M. Moreira
 Mário Alberto Pereira
 Lélio Almeida Ribeiro
 Manuel Silva Pereira

References

External links
Organizing Committee for the Games of the XXth Olympiad Munich 1972 (1974). Official Report of the Organizing Committee for the Games of the XXth Olympiad Munich 1972, Volume 1: The organization (Retrieved on 7 November 2006).
Organizing Committee for the Games of the XXth Olympiad Munich 1972 (1974). Official Report of the Organizing Committee for the Games of the XXth Olympiad Munich 1972, Volume 3: The competitions (Retrieved on 7 November 2006).

Nations at the 1972 Summer Olympics
1972 Summer Olympics
1972 in Portuguese sport